Feridun İsmail Buğeker (5 April 1933 – 6 October 2014) was a Turkish football forward who played for Turkey in the 1954 FIFA World Cup. He also played for Fenerbahçe S.K. between 1950–55 and 1961–63.

He died on October 6, 2014, and was laid to rest at the Feriköy Cemetery, Istanbul.

References

External links
FIFA profile

1933 births
Turkish footballers
Turkey international footballers
Association football forwards
Fenerbahçe S.K. footballers
1954 FIFA World Cup players
Beyoğlu SK footballers
Stuttgarter Kickers players
Süper Lig players
Turkish expatriate footballers
Expatriate footballers in Germany
2014 deaths
Burials at Feriköy Cemetery